Robert Van Lewing (March 27, 1921 – December 17, 1983) was an American bank robber and listed on the FBI's Ten Most Wanted list from 1966–1967.

Background
A long time career criminal, Lewing's criminal record included prior arrests and convictions on a number of armed robbery charges before being officially added as the 226th fugitive to the FBI's Ten Most Wanted list on January 12, 1966.

In March 1966, entered a St. Louis bank and, threatening the bank teller with a pistol, escaped with $2,456. After being identified by three eyewitnesses, Lewing fled St. Louis, but he remained in Missouri. Eventually traced to Kansas City, Lewing was arrested by FBI agents on February 6, 1967 and later convicted of several federal bank robbery charges.

References

Books
Newton, Michael. Encyclopedia of Robbers, Heists, and Capers. New York: Facts On File Inc., 2002.

1921 births
1983 deaths
American bank robbers
Fugitives